The 1948 AAFC Draft was the second collegiate draft of the All-America Football Conference (AAFC). The draft expanded to 30 rounds, but not all teams selected in each round. For example: Baltimore and Chicago were the only teams with picks in the second round. Chicago, Brooklyn and Baltimore had 5 selections in the first 5 rounds, while Cleveland and New York which were stronger teams had only 2.

Player selections

References

External links
 1948 AAFC Draft
 1948 AAFC Draft Pick Transactions

All-America Football Conference
All-America Football Conference
AAFC